A list of films produced by the Israeli film industry in 1971.

1971 releases

See also
1971 in Israel

References

External links
 Israeli films of 1971 at the Internet Movie Database

Israeli
Film
1971